Janet Jessica Daby (née Sarju; born 15 December 1970) is a British politician who has served as Member of Parliament (MP) for Lewisham East since 2018. A member of the Labour Party, she was Shadow Minister for Faiths from April to December 2020 and a Shadow Minister for Women and Equalities from July to December 2020.

Early life 
Janet Jessica Sarju was born to parents who were Windrush migrants from Guyana and Jamaica. She was brought up on a council estate where, as a child, racists pelted her windows with eggs three nights in a row. She attended Blackheath Bluecoat School in Greenwich. She worked in volunteer management and children's social care, acting as a registered fostering manager.

Political career 
Daby was elected as a Lewisham borough councillor at the 2010 local elections, in which she gained the Whitefoot ward from the Liberal Democrats and received the most votes of the three elected candidates. She was re-elected in 2014 and 2018, also topping the poll on these occasions. In addition, Daby served as deputy mayor of the London Borough of Lewisham during this period. In 2013, she founded the Whitefoot and Downham Community Food + Project, which she also became a director of.

A by-election was triggered in Lewisham East by the resignation of the incumbent Labour MP Heidi Alexander in May 2018; the seat, which included Daby's Whitefoot ward, has generally been considered safe for the Labour Party in recent years. Daby was selected as Labour's by-election candidate after hustings involving an all-women shortlist. She retained the seat for Labour at the June 2018 by-election with 50.2% of the vote, although Labour's majority was reduced by 19.3%. In response to ongoing uncertainty over Brexit, Daby pledged to fight for the UK to remain in the European Union customs union and the single market.

Daby announced her resignation as a Lewisham councillor on 20 March 2019, to concentrate on her role as an MP, noting that she would continue to represent Whitefoot residents in the Houses of Parliament. She was re-elected to Parliament at the December 2019 general election with 26,661 votes, representing a majority of 17,008. 

On 9 April 2020, Daby was given her first shadow ministerial post by Labour Party leader Keir Starmer as Shadow Minister for Faiths. She also became a Shadow Minister for Women and Equalities in July 2020.

She resigned from the front bench on 7 December 2020, after she suggested that registrars who have a religious objection to same-sex marriage should be protected from losing their jobs if they refuse to certify the partnership, an action which would be viewed as unlawful discrimination. She later apologised for her remarks.

Daby was appointed Parliamentary Private Secretary to the shadow Foreign, Commonwealth and Development Affairs team on 4 December 2021.

Personal life 
Daby married Donald Daby in 2003; the couple have a son and a daughter. She has lived in Lewisham for over 20 years.

References

External links

1970 births
Living people
21st-century British women politicians
Black British women politicians
Councillors in the London Borough of Lewisham
English people of Guyanese descent
English people of Jamaican descent
Female members of the Parliament of the United Kingdom for English constituencies
Labour Party (UK) MPs for English constituencies
People from the London Borough of Lewisham
UK MPs 2017–2019
UK MPs 2019–present
Black British MPs
Women councillors in England
Labour Party (UK) councillors